The 2015–16 Portland Trail Blazers season was the franchise's 46th season in the National Basketball Association (NBA). In the First Round of the Playoffs, the Blazers defeated the injury depleted Los Angeles Clippers in six games. However, their season ended in the next round with a defeat to the defending NBA champion and eventual Western Conference champion Golden State Warriors in five games.

This was the Blazers' first season since 2005-06 without LaMarcus Aldridge as he joined the San Antonio Spurs during the summer.

Draft picks

Roster

Standings

Division

Conference

Game log

Preseason

|- style="background:#fbb;"
| 1
| October 5
| Sacramento
| 105–109 OT
| Damian Lillard (17)
| Noah Vonleh (11)
| Damian Lillard (4)
| Moda Center14,976
| 0–1
|- style="background:#bfb;"
| 2
| October 8
| Golden State
| 118–101
| Damian Lillard (22)
| Ed Davis (9)
| Tim Frazier (6)
| Moda Center19,303
| 1–1
|- style="background:#fbb;"
| 3
| October 10
| @ Sacramento
| 90–94
| CJ McCollum (30)
| Pat Connaughton (11)
| Phil Pressey (5)
| Sleep Train Arena14,172
| 1–2
|- style="background:#bfb;"
| 4
| October 12
| @ Utah
| 88–81
| Meyers Leonard (19)
| Meyers Leonard (8)
| CJ McCollum (5)
| EnergySolutions Arena15,171
| 2–2
|- style="background:#bfb;"
| 5
| October 18
| Utah
| 116–111 OT
| Damian Lillard (22)
| Ed Davis (14)
| CJ McCollum (9)
| Moda Center16,352
| 3–2
|- style="background:#fbb;"
| 6
| October 19
| @ L. A. Lakers
| 102–104
| Damian Lillard (22)
| Noah Vonleh (10)
| Damian Lillard (6)
| EnergySolutions Arena15,123
| 3–3
|- style="background:#fbb;"
| 7
| October 22
| @ L. A. Clippers
| 109–115
| Damian Lillard (39)
| Noah Vonleh (7)
| Damian Lillard (9)
| Staples Center13,969
| 3–4

Regular season

|- style="background:#bfb;"
| 1
| October 28
| New Orleans
| 
| CJ McCollum (37)
| Ed Davis (11)
| Damian Lillard (11)
| Moda Center19,393
| 1–0
|-style="background:#fbb;"
| 2
| October 30
| @ Phoenix
| 
| Damian Lillard (24)
| Al-Farouq Aminu (10)
| Damian Lillard (6)
| Talking Stick Resort Arena18,055
| 1–1
|-style="background:#fbb;"
| 3
| October 31
| Phoenix
| 
| Damian Lillard (23)
| Ed Davis (11)
| Damian Lillard (8)
| Moda Center17,906
| 1–2

|-style="background:#bfb;"
| 4
| November 2
| @ Minnesota
| 
| Damian Lillard (34)
| Ed Davis (11)
| Damian Lillard (7)
| Target Center18,903
| 2–2
|-style="background:#bfb;"
| 5
| November 4
| @ Utah
| 
| Damian Lillard (35)
| Mason Plumlee (16)
| CJ McCollum (4)
| Vivint Smart Home Arena19,911
| 3–2
|- style="background:#bfb;"
| 6
| November 5
| Memphis
| 
| Damian Lillard (27)
| Mason Plumlee (12)
| Aminu, McCollum, Lillard (5)
| Moda Center19,393
| 4–2
|- style="background:#fbb;"
| 7
| November 8
| Detroit
| 
| Damian Lillard (26)
| Al-Farouq Aminu (9)
| Damian Lillard (11)
| Moda Center19,393
| 4–3
|- style="background:#fbb;"
| 8
| November 9
| @ Denver
| 
| Damian Lillard (30)
| Meyers Leonard (9)
| Damian Lillard (7)
| Pepsi Center9,153
| 4–4
|- style="background:#fbb;"
| 9
| November 11
| San Antonio
| 
| Damian Lillard (23)
| Mason Plumlee (9)
| Damian Lillard (9)
| Moda Center19,393
| 4–5
|- style="background:#fbb;"
| 10
| November 13
| @ Memphis
| 
| CJ McCollum (26)
| Aminu, Davis (8)
| Damian Lillard (7)
| FedExForum16,919
| 4–6
|- style="background:#fbb;"
| 11
| November 15
| @ Charlotte
| 
| Damian Lillard (23)
| Mason Plumlee (13)
| Damian Lillard (5)
| Time Warner Cable Arena15,317
| 4–7
|- style="background:#fbb;"
| 12
| November 16
| @ San Antonio
| 
| Damian Lillard (27)
| Damian Lillard (7)
| Damian Lillard (6)
| AT&T Center18,418
| 4–8
|- style="background:#fbb;"
| 13
| November 18
| @ Houston
| 
| Damian Lillard (23)
| Al-Farouq Aminu (15)
| CJ McCollum (6)
| Toyota Center17,107
| 4–9
|- style="background:#bfb;"
| 14
| November 20
| L.A. Clippers
| 
| Damian Lillard (27)
| Ed Davis (15)
| Damian Lillard (7)
| Moda Center19,393
| 5–9
|- style="background:#bfb;"
| 15
| November 22
| @ L.A. Lakers
| 
| Damian Lillard (30)
| Mason Plumlee (11)
| Damian Lillard (13)
| Staples Center18,997
| 6–9
|- style="background:#fbb;"
| 16
| November 24
| Chicago
| 
| Damian Lillard (19)
| Mason Plumlee (17)
| Damian Lillard (8)
| Moda Center19,393
| 6–10
|- style="background:#bfb;"
| 17
| November 28
| L. A. Lakers
| 
| Damian Lillard (29)
| Al-Farouq Aminu (9)
| Damian Lillard (7)
| Moda Center20,019
| 7–10
|- style="background:#fbb;"
| 18
| November 30
| @ L. A. Clippers
| 
| Maurice Harkless (15)
| Mason Plumlee (13)
| CJ McCollum (10)
| Moda Center19,060
| 7–11

|- style="background:#fbb;"
| 19
| December 1
| Dallas
| 
| Damian Lillard (25)
| Ed Davis (11)
| Damian Lillard (10)
| Moda Center19,393
| 7–12
|- style="background:#bfb;"
| 20
| December 3
| Indiana
| 
| Damian Lillard (26)
| Ed Davis (13)
| Damian Lillard (9)
| Moda Center19,206
| 8–12
|-style="background:#bfb;"
| 21
| December 5
| @ Minnesota
| 
| Damian Lillard (19)
| Mason Plumlee (9)
| Damian Lillard (7)
| Target Center16,203
| 9–12
|-style="background:#fbb;"
| 22
| December 7
| @ Milwaukee
| 
| Damian Lillard (23)
| Ed Davis (13)
| Damian Lillard (7)
| BMO Harris Bradley Center14,389
| 9–13
|-style="background:#fbb;"
| 23
| December 8
| @ Cleveland
| 
| Damian Lillard (33)
| Damian Lillard (6)
| Damian Lillard (6)
| Quicken Loans Arena20,562
| 9–14
|-style="background:#bfb;"
| 24
| December 11
| @ Phoenix
| 
| CJ McCollum (26)
| Al-Farouq Aminu (13)
| Damian Lillard (7)
| Talking Stick Resort Arena17,028
| 10–14
|-style="background:#fbb;"
| 25
| December 12
| New York
| 
| Damian Lillard (29)
| Damian Lillard (8)
| Damian Lillard (4)
| Moda Center19,511
| 10–15
|-style="background:#bfb;"
| 26
| December 14
| New Orleans
| 
| Damian Lillard (30)
| Mason Plumlee (13)
| McCollum, Plumlee (6)
| Moda Center19,231
| 11–15
|-style="background:#fbb;"
| 27
| December 16
| @ Oklahoma City
| 
| CJ McCollum (24)
| Mason Plumlee (10)
| CJ McCollum (4)
| Chesapeake Energy Arena18,203
| 11–16
|-style="background:#fbb;"
| 28
| December 18
| @ Orlando
| 
| CJ McCollum (29)
| Mason Plumlee (10)
| Damian Lillard (10)
| Amway Center17,156
| 11–17
|-style="background:#fbb;"
| 29
| December 20
| @ Miami
| 
| Damian Lillard (32)
| Meyers Leonard (9)
| Damian Lillard (9)
| AmericanAirlines Arena19,600
| 11–18
|-style="background:#fbb;"
| 30
| December 21
| @ Atlanta
| 
| Allen Crabbe (19)
| Mason Plumlee (10)
| Mason Plumlee (6)
| Philips Arena18,373
| 11–19
|-style="background:#fbb;"
| 31
| December 23
| @ New Orleans
| 
| CJ McCollum (19)
| Davis, Plumlee (12)
| CJ McCollum (7)
| Smoothie King Center16,686
| 11–20
|-style="background:#bfb;"
| 32
| December 26
| Cleveland
| 
| Allen Crabbe (26)
| Mason Plumlee (14)
| CJ McCollum (6)
| Moda Center19,393
| 12–20
|- style="background:#bfb;"
| 33
| December 27
| @ Sacramento
| 
| CJ McCollum (35)
| Leonard, McCollum (11)
| CJ McCollum (9)
| Sleep Train Arena17,317
| 13–20
|- style="background:#bfb;"
| 34
| December 30
| Denver
| 
| CJ McCollum (29)
| Al-Farouq Aminu (9)
| Aminu, McCollum, Plumlee  (4)
| Moda Center19,393
| 14–20
|- style="background:#fbb;"
| 35
| December 31
| @ Utah
| 
| CJ McCollum (32)
| Mason Plumlee (9)
| CJ McCollum (6)
| Vivint Smart Home Arena19,380
| 14–21

|- style="background:#bfb;"
| 36
| January 3
| @ Denver
| 
| CJ McCollum (25)
| Ed Davis (9)
| CJ McCollum (7)
| Pepsi Center11,883
| 15–21
|- style="background:#fbb;"
| 37
| January 4
| Memphis
| 
| Damian Lillard (17)
| Al-Farouq Aminu (14)
| Damian Lillard (7)
| Moda Center18,832
| 15–22
|- style="background:#fbb;"
| 38
| January 6
| L. A. Clippers
| 
| Damian Lillard (20)
| Ed Davis (12)
| Damian Lillard (9)
| Moda Center18,598
| 15–23
|- style="background:#fbb;"
| 39
| January 8
| Golden State
| 
| Damian Lillard (40)
| Aminu, Davis (7)
| Damian Lillard (10)
| Moda Center20,035
| 15–24
|- style="background:#bfb;"
| 40
| January 10
| Oklahoma City
| 
| Damian Lillard (31)
| Mason Plumlee (11)
| Damian Lillard (9)
| Moda Center19,393
| 16–24
|- style="background:#bfb;"
| 41
| January 13
| Utah
| 
| Damian Lillard (21)
| Ed Davis (12)
| Damian Lillard (10)
| Moda Center19,393
| 17–24
|- style="background:#bfb;"
| 42
| January 15
| @ Brooklyn
| 
| Damian Lillard (33)
| Ed Davis (10)
| Damian Lillard (10)
| Barclays Center14,749
| 18–24
|- style="background:#fbb;"
| 43
| January 16
| @ Philadelphia
| 
| Leonard, Lillard (14)
| Meyers Leonard (7)
| Tim Frazier (5)
| Wells Fargo Center15,698
| 18–25
|- style="background:#bfb;"
| 44
| January 18
| @ Washington
| 
| CJ McCollum (25)
| Mason Plumlee (11)
| Mason Plumlee (7)
| Verizon Center17,236
| 19–25
|- style="background:#fbb;"
| 45
| January 20
| Atlanta
| 
| CJ McCollum (26)
| Meyers Leonard (10)
| Damian Lillard (8)
| Moda Center18,783
| 19–26
|- style="background:#bfb;"
| 46
| January 23
| L. A. Lakers
| 
| Damian Lillard (36)
| Davis, Plumlee (8)
| Mason Plumlee (6)
| Moda Center19,728
| 20–26
|-style="background:#bfb;"
| 47
| January 26
| Sacramento
| 
| CJ McCollum (18)
| Mason Plumlee (8)
| Damian Lillard (13)
| Moda Center19,393
| 21–26
|-style="background:#bfb;"
| 48
| January 29
| Charlotte
| 
| Damian Lillard (22)
| Aminu, Plumlee (12)
| Damian Lillard (6)
| Moda Center19,393
| 22–26
|- style="background:#bfb;"
| 49
| January 31
| Minnesota
| 
| Lillard, McCollum (21)
| Noah Vonleh (8)
| Damian Lillard (8)
| Moda Center19,393
| 23–26

|- style="background:#bfb;"
| 50
| February 2
| Milwaukee
| 
| CJ McCollum (30)
| Mason Plumlee (8)
| Damian Lillard (12)
| Moda Center18,306
| 24–26
|- style="background:#fbb;"
| 51
| February 4
| Toronto
| 
| Damian Lillard (27)
| Ed Davis (7)
| Damian Lillard (11)
| Moda Center19,393
| 24–27
|- style="background:#bfb;"
| 52
| February 6
| @ Houston
| 
| Damian Lillard (21)
| Ed Davis (9)
| Damian Lillard (10)
| Toyota Center18,308
| 25–27
|- style="background:#bfb;"
| 53
| February 8
| @ Memphis
| 
| Damian Lillard (33)
| Ed Davis (8)
| CJ McCollum (6)
| FedExForum15,892
| 26–27
|- style="background:#bfb;"
| 54
| February 10
| Houston
| 
| Damian Lillard (31)
| Davis, Plumlee (13)
| Damian Lillard (9)
| Moda Center19,393
| 27–27
|- align="center"
|colspan="9" bgcolor="#bbcaff"|All-Star Break
|- style="background:#bfb;"
| 55
| February 19
| Golden State
| 
| Damian Lillard (51)
| Davis, Harkless (8)
| McCollum, Lillard (7)
| Moda Center20,100
| 28–27
|- style="background:#bfb;"
| 56
| February 21
| Utah
| 
| CJ McCollum (31)
| Mason Plumlee (9)
| Mason Plumlee (6)
| Moda Center19,470
| 29–27
|- style="background:#bfb;"
| 57
| February 23
| Brooklyn
| 
| McCollum, Lillard (34)
| Mason Plumlee (13)
| CJ McCollum (6)
| Moda Center19,393
| 30–27
|- style="background:#fbb;"
| 58
| February 25
| Houston
| 
| Damian Lillard (23)
| Ed Davis (12)
| Damian Lillard (7)
| Moda Center19,393
| 30–28
|- style="background:#bfb;"
| 59
| February 27
| @ Chicago
| 
| Damian Lillard (31)
| Davis, Plumlee (9)
| CJ McCollum (7)
| United Center21,962
| 31–28
|-style="background:#bfb;"
| 60
| February 28
| @ Indiana
| 
| Damian Lillard (33)
| Aminu, Plumlee (9)
| Allen Crabbe (4)
| Bankers Life Fieldhouse16,662
| 32–28

|- style="background:#bfb;"
| 61
| March 1
| @ New York
| 
| Damian Lillard (30)
| Meyers Leonard (14)
| Damian Lillard (6)
| Madison Square Garden19,812
| 33–28
|- style="background:#fbb;"
| 62
| March 2
| @ Boston
| 
| Damian Lillard (20)
| Harkless, Leonard, Plumlee (7)
| Aminu, Plumlee (3)
| TD Garden18,624
| 33–29
|- style="background:#fbb;"
| 63
| March 4
| @ Toronto
| 
| Damian Lillard (50)
| Ed Davis (7)
| McCollum, Lillard (5)
| Air Canada Centre19,800
| 33–30
|- style="background:#fbb;"
| 64
| March 6
| @ Detroit
| 
| Damian Lillard (26)
| Henderson, Lillard (5)
| McCollum, Lillard (5)
| Palace of Auburn Hills18,386
| 33–31
|- style="background:#bfb;"
| 65
| March 8
| Washington
| 
| Damian Lillard (41)
| Ed Davis (15)
| Damian Lillard (11)
| Moda Center19,393
| 34–31
|- style="background:#fbb;"
| 66
| March 11
| @ Golden State
| 
| CJ McCollum (18)
| Mason Plumlee (9)
| Damian Lillard (5)
| Oracle Arena19,596
| 34–32
|- style="background:#bfb;"
| 67
| March 12
| Orlando
| 
| Damian Lillard (19)
| Mason Plumlee (11)
| Damian Lillard (10)
| Moda Center19,452
| 35–32
|- style="background:#fbb;"
| 68
| March 14
| @ Oklahoma City
| 
| Damian Lillard (21)
| Mason Plumlee (8)
| Damian Lillard (4)
| Chesapeake Energy Arena18,203
| 35–33
|- style="background:#fbb;"
| 69
| March 17
| @ San Antonio
| 
| CJ McCollum (26)
| Ed Davis (9)
| Damian Lillard (6)
| AT&T Center18,418
| 35–34
|- style="background:#bfb;"
| 70
| March 18
| @ New Orleans
| 
| Damian Lillard (33)
| Ed Davis (10)
| McCollum, Lillard (6)
| Smoothie King Center17,263
| 36–34
|- style="background:#fbb;"
| 71
| March 20
| @ Dallas
| 
| Damian Lillard (26)
| Mason Plumlee (19)
| McCollum, Lillard (8)
| American Airlines Center20,351
| 36–35
|- style="background:#bfb;"
| 72
| March 23
| Dallas
| 
| Damian Lillard (27)
| Al-Farouq Aminu (10)
| Damian Lillard (6)
| Moda Center19,819
| 37–35
|- style="background:#fbb;"
| 73
| March 24
| @ L. A. Clippers
| 
| Damian Lillard (18)
| Davis, Harkless (8)
| Damian Lillard (8)
| STAPLES Center19,359
| 37–36
|- style="background:#bfb;"
| 74
| March 26
| Philadelphia
| 
| CJ McCollum (25)
| Ed Davis (13)
| Damian Lillard (7)
| Moda Center19,506
| 38–36
|- style="background:#bfb;"
| 75
| March 28
| Sacramento
| 
| Allen Crabbe (21)
| Ed Davis (9)
| Damian Lillard (9)
| Moda Center19,393
| 39–36
|- style="background:#bfb;"
| 76
| March 31
| Boston
| 
| Al-Farouq Aminu (28)
| Maurice Harkless (10)
| CJ McCollum (8)
| Moda Center19,393
| 40–36

|- style="background:#bfb;"
| 77
| April 2
| Miami
| 
| CJ McCollum (24)
| Ed Davis (11)
| CJ McCollum (7)
| Moda Center19,633
| 41–36
|- style="background:#fbb;"
| 78
| April 3
| @ Golden State
| 
| Damian Lillard (38)
| Maurice Harkless (10)
| Al-Farouq Aminu (5)
| Oracle Arena19,596
| 41–37
|- style="background:#bfb;"
| 79
| April 5
| @ Sacramento
| 
| CJ McCollum (30)
| Maurice Harkless (16)
| Damian Lillard (8)
| Sleep Train Arena17,317
| 42–37
|- style="background:#bfb;"
| 80
| April 6
| Oklahoma City
| 
| Al-Farouq Aminu (27)
| Ed Davis (8)
| Damian Lillard (9)
| Moda Center19,393
| 43–37
|- style="background:#fbb;"
| 81
| April 9
| Minnesota
| 
| Damian Lillard (31)
| Mason Plumlee (15)
| Damian Lillard (7)
| Moda Center19,733
| 43–38
|- style="background:#bfb;"
| 82
| April 13
| Denver
| 
| Damian Lillard (21)
| Ed Davis (9)
| Lillard, McCollum (5)
| Moda Center19,571
| 44–38

Playoffs

Game log

|- style="background:#fbb;"
| 1
| April 17
| @ L.A. Clippers
| 
| Damian Lillard (21)
| Al-Farouq Aminu (12)
| Damian Lillard (8)
| STAPLES Center19,122
| 0–1
|- style="background:#fbb;"
| 2
| April 20
| @ L.A. Clippers
| 
| Lillard, Plumlee (17)
| Mason Plumlee (10)
| Mason Plumlee (7)
| STAPLES Center19,127
| 0–2
|- style="background:#bfb;"
| 3
| April 23
| L.A. Clippers
| 
| Damian Lillard (32)
| Mason Plumlee (21)
| Mason Plumlee (9)
| Moda Center19,761
| 1–2
|- style="background:#bfb;"
| 4
| April 25
| L.A. Clippers
| 
| Al-Farouq Aminu (30)
| Mason Plumlee (14)
| Mason Plumlee (10)
| Moda Center19,607
| 2–2
|- style="background:#bfb;"
| 5
| April 27
| @ L.A. Clippers
| 
| CJ McCollum (27)
| Mason Plumlee (15)
| Damian Lillard (5)
| STAPLES Center19,060
| 3–2
|- style="background:#bfb;"
| 6
| April 29
| L.A. Clippers
| 
| Damian Lillard (28)
| Mason Plumlee (14)
| Damian Lillard (7)
| Moda Center19,768
| 4–2

|- style="background:#fbb;"
| 1
| May 1
| @ Golden State
| 
| Damian Lillard (30)
| Mason Plumlee (13)
| Mason Plumlee (6)
| Oracle Arena19,596
| 0–1
|- style="background:#fbb;"
| 2
| May 3
| @ Golden State
| 
| Damian Lillard (25)
| Mason Plumlee (11)
| Damian Lillard (6)
| Oracle Arena19,596
| 0–2
|- style="background:#bfb;"
| 3
| May 7
| Golden State
| 
| Damian Lillard (40)
| Al-Farouq Aminu (10)
| Damian Lillard (10)
| Moda Center19,673
| 1–2
|- style="background:#fbb;"
| 4
| May 9
| Golden State
| 
| Damian Lillard (36)
| Mason Plumlee (15)
| Damian Lillard (10)
| Moda Center19,583
| 1–3
|- style="background:#fbb;"
| 5
| May 11
| @ Golden State
| 
| Damian Lillard (28)
| Al-Farouq Aminu (9)
| Damian Lillard (7)
| Oracle Arena19,596
| 1–4

References

Portland Trail Blazers seasons
Portland Trail Blazers
Portland Trail Blazers
Portland Trail Blazers
Port
Port